Barry Hill is a former professional American football player who played defensive back for the Miami Dolphins. Hill was drafted in the 5th round of the 1975 NFL Draft. He enjoyed a successful rookie campaign, winning the teams' Tommy Fitzgerald Award as the outstanding rookie in training camp as well as being named the Outstanding Special Teams Player.

College

Barry Hill was a three-year letterman in college, playing cornerback and safety for the Cyclones from 1972-74.

Hill was generally regarded as the best athlete on the ISU campus after starring in football and basketball at Carver High School in Delray Beach, Fla. Hill turned down a basketball scholarship from Brown University.

References

1953 births
2010 deaths
American football safeties
Iowa State Cyclones football players
Miami Dolphins players
People from Okaloosa County, Florida
Sportspeople from Delray Beach, Florida